This is a list of the more notable Rijksmonuments (national heritage sites) in the Netherlands. The list is sorted by province. There are over 60,000 Rijksmonuments in the Rijksmonumentenregister (national heritage register).

Drenthe
See List of Rijksmonuments in Drenthe

Flevoland
See List of Rijksmonuments in Flevoland or :Category:Rijksmonuments in Flevoland

Friesland
See List of Rijksmonuments in Friesland

Gelderland
See List of Rijksmonuments in Gelderland

Groningen

See List of Rijksmonuments in Groningen (province) or :Category:Rijksmonuments in Groningen (province)

Limburg

See List of Rijksmonuments in Limburg or :Category:Rijksmonuments in Limburg

North Brabant

North Holland

See List of Rijksmonuments in North Holland or :Category:Rijksmonuments in North Holland

Overijssel

See List of Rijksmonuments in Overijssel or :Category:Rijksmonuments in Overijssel

South Holland

See List of Rijksmonuments in South Holland or :Category:Rijksmonuments in South Holland

Utrecht

See List of Rijksmonuments in Utrecht (province) or :Category:Rijksmonuments in Utrecht (province)

Zeeland

See List of Rijksmonuments in Zeeland or :Category:Rijksmonuments in Zeeland

References

 

nl:Rijksmonument#Lijsten van rijksmonumenten per provincie